Hugh "Bulldog" Drummond is a fictional character, created by H. C. McNeile and published under his pen name "Sapper". Following McNeile's death in 1937, the novels were continued by Gerard Fairlie. Drummond is a First World War veteran who, fed up with his sedate lifestyle, advertises looking for excitement, and becomes a gentleman adventurer. The character has appeared in novels, short stories, on the stage, in films, on radio and television, and in graphic novels.

Overview
After an unsuccessful one-off appearance as a policeman in The Strand Magazine, the character was reworked by McNeile into a gentleman adventurer for his 1920 novel Bulldog Drummond. McNeile went on to write ten Drummond novels, four short stories, four stage plays and a screenplay before his death in 1937. The stories were continued by his friend Gerard Fairlie between 1938 and 1954.

Drummond is a First World War veteran, brutalised by his experiences in the trenches and bored with his post-war lifestyle. He publishes an advertisement looking for adventure, and soon finds himself embroiled in a series of exploits, many of which involve Carl Peterson—who becomes his nemesis—and Peterson's mistress, the femme fatale Irma. After his first adventure, Drummond marries his client, Phyllis Benton. In later episodes, Benton becomes involved in Drummond's exploits, often as the victim of kidnapping by Drummond's enemies.

In 1921 an adaptation of the first novel was staged in London, with Gerald du Maurier playing the role of Drummond; the play was further adapted for the 1922 silent film Bulldog Drummond, with Carlyle Blackwell in the lead role. Several other Drummond films followed, either based on McNeile's stories or with unique storylines.

Fictional biography

The Bulldog Drummond stories of H. C. McNeile follow Captain Hugh "Bulldog" Drummond, DSO, MC. Drummond is a member of "the Breed", a class of Englishman who were patriotic, loyal and "physically and morally intrepid". Drummond is a wealthy gentleman, formerly an officer in the fictional "Royal Loamshire Regiment", who, after the First World War, spends his new-found leisure time looking for adventure. McNeile first wrote the Drummond character as a detective for a short story in The Strand Magazine, but the portrayal was not successful and was changed for the novel Bull-dog Drummond, which was a thriller. The character was an amalgam of McNeile's friend Gerard Fairlie, and his idea of an English gentleman, although writer J.D. Bourn disputes Fairlie's claim to be a model for the character, noting that "he was still at school when Sapper created his ... hero". Drummond also had roots in the literary characters Sherlock Holmes, Sexton Blake, Richard Hannay and The Scarlet Pimpernel.

Drummond's wartime experience had given him a series of abilities akin to that of a hunter: stealth—"he could move over ground without a single blade of grass rustling"—and the ability to incapacitate others—"he could kill a man with his bare hands in a second". During his time on the Western Front he would take himself on solitary raids through no man's land. Drummond was also proficient in jujutsu and boxing, was a crack shot, played cricket for the Free Foresters, and was an excellent poker player. In addition to Drummond's physical attributes is his common sense, which allows him to equal and beat his opponents, even if they have a superior intellect.

Drummond is characterised as large, very strong, physically unattractive and an "apparently brainless hunk of a man", He is six feet tall, weighs around 14 stone, and has a "cheerful type of ugliness which inspires immediate confidence in its owner". Throughout his exploits, Drummond is joined by several of his ex-army friends and colleagues, including Algy Longworth (who would appear in many of the films, as Drummond's sidekick), MC; Toby Sinclair, VC; Peter Darrell and Ted Jerningham. Drummond's ex-batman from his military days, James Denny, runs Drummond's flat on Half-Moon Street in Mayfair, London, along with Mrs Denny. (Denny appeared as Drummond's sidekick in the radio series, a version of the character named Tenny appeared in the films) Drummond is a gentleman with a private income; he is also construed as "a brutalized ex-officer whose thirst for excitement is also an attempt to reenact  the war", although the character was later described by Cecil Day-Lewis, author of gentleman detective Nigel Strangeways, as an "unspeakable public school bully".

The novel Bulldog Drummond begins when Drummond places an advertisement in a newspaper looking for adventure to lift the ennui of his life in post-war London. The response comes from Phyllis Benton, who is concerned for the health and well-being of her father, over whom Henry Lakington and Carl Peterson have a hold. At the end of the novel Drummond and Phyllis marry, and remain married throughout the course of the McNeile and Fairlie series of books, in contrast to the films, which generally portray Drummond as unmarried. Phyllis becomes integral to the plot of some of the novels: she is kidnapped by Irma Peterson in several stories, including The Black Gang and The Female of the Species.

In the matter of his personal tastes, Drummond is a member of the fictional Junior Sports Club, a gentleman's club on St. James's Square, London. His preferred drink is beer although he also enjoys drinking martinis and is knowledgeable about wines. Drummond owns both a Rolls-Royce and a Bentley.

Although Drummond's actions are intended to maintain the conservative status quo of Britain, academic Hans Bertens considers that instead, he comes across as "a murderous exponent of a fierce competitive individualism".

Carl and Irma Peterson
The first four books deal with Drummond against Carl Peterson, who becomes Drummond's arch-enemy. Peterson is also a master of disguise and uses several aliases. Peterson is killed in the fourth book, The Final Count, although Fairlie brings him back for his final novel, The Return of the Black Gang. Drummond forms a grudging respect for Peterson, and offers an honourable duel to the death at the end of The Third Round, instead of the usual summary justice that normally befalls members of Peterson's gang. The writer Richard Usborne sees the mass-murdering terrorist Peterson as "quite a sympathetic character. Almost, in fact, a hero", and wrote that "authors ... fall in love with their big villains ... Sapper came to love Carl Peterson dearly, and so did Drummond".

The title of the fifth Drummond book, The Female of the Species refers to Rudyard Kipling's line "the female of the species is more deadly than the male". Irma is described by Jonathon Green as "the slinky epitome of a twenties 'vamp, and by Lawrence Treadwell as dark, sexy and from an oriental background, "a true femme fatale". After Carl Peterson's death in The Final Count, Irma swears revenge on Drummond and kidnaps his wife—whom he had met in Bulldog Drummond—with the intent of killing him in the ensuing chase. Irma Peterson appears in six of McNeile's books, and in a further five by Fairlie.

Works

Novels 

All were published through Hodder & Stoughton.

Drummond has also appeared in other works. In 1983 Jack Smithers wrote the spoof Combined Forces, and in 1990 Kim Newman—under the name Jack Yeovil—wrote the short story "Pitbull Brittan", which features Drummond.

Short stories
These short stories are all by McNeile.

Stage

McNeile and Gerald du Maurier adapted the first novel, Bulldog Drummond for the stage, where it was shown at Wyndham's Theatre during the 1921–22 season. du Maurier played the title role in a run of 428 performances. Du Maurier again played the role on 8 November 1932 in a special charity performance at the Royal Adelphi Theatre attended by King George V. The play also ran in New York during the same season, with A. E. Matthews as Drummond. McNeile also wrote The Way Out, which was staged at the Comedy Theatre, London in January 1930 with Ian Hunter as Drummond. A third Drummond play, Bulldog Drummond Hits Out, was co-written by McNeile and Fairlie. It went on a tour of the UK in 1937 with Henry Edwards as Drummond, and opened on 21 December 1937 at the Savoy Theatre, London, where it had a short run. Fairlie later turned the storyline into the novel Bulldog Drummond on Dartmoor, published in 1938.

In 1974 the play Bullshot Crummond, by Ron House, was staged with Alan Shearman as Crummond. The play was subsequently made into the 1983 film Bullshot.

Film

In 1933 Alfred Hitchcock was set to direct a Bulldog Drummond film with a screenplay by Charles Bennett entitled Bulldog Drummond's Baby. The rights to the character of Drummond were then held by British International Pictures, who would not sell the rights to use the characters for Bennett's screenplay.  Bennett and Hitchcock turned the film into The Man Who Knew Too Much without Drummond.

Radio 

A Bulldog Drummond radio series ran on the Mutual Broadcasting System from 13 April 1941 to 12 January 1949. An attempt was made at a revival between 3 January and 28 March 1954. Drummond was initially portrayed by George Coulouris, before being taken over by Santos Ortega and Ned Wever after 1942; Cedric Hardwicke took over in 1954.

Television 
A 30-minute episode of Douglas Fairbanks Jr., Presents featured Drummond in "The Ludlow Affair", first broadcast on UK television on 16 December 1956. Drummond was played by Robert Beatty; he was aided by Kelly, played by Michael Ripper. A 1973 BBC documentary Omnibus, "The British Hero", featured Christopher Cazenove playing Drummond, as well as a number of other such heroic characters, including Richard Hannay, Beau Geste and James Bond.

Comics
Adaptations of the first and fourth novels appeared in Super Detective Library #3 and #13 respectively. In 2004 Moonstone Books released a Bulldog Drummond comic book written by William Messner-Loebs and illustrated by Brett Barkley, while in The League of Extraordinary Gentlemen: Black Dossier, written by Alan Moore and illustrated by Kevin O'Neill, a thinly disguised, elderly version of Drummond, called "Hugo Drummond", is one of the three Secret Service agents tasked to hunt down the heroes of the piece.

Reception
The Drummond series proved popular with contemporary audiences, with Bulldog Drummond selling 396,302 copies between 1920 and 1939, exceeding the 100,000-copy benchmark for "best-sellers". At his peak in the 1920s, McNeile was the highest-paid short-story writer in the world, and it was estimated that in the last five years of his life he was earning around £10,000 a year (approximately ); the Daily Mirror estimated that during his writing career he had earned £85,000.

When reviewing Bulldog Drummond Strikes Back for The New York Times, the critic observed that "if you like a good knock-down-and-drag-out yarn with excitement and violence on nearly every page, you can't go wrong on Bulldog Drummond"; for the novel Bulldog Drummond at Bay, the reviewer considered that "as a piece of fictional melodrama, the book is first rate". In the British market, The Times Literary Supplement also characterised McNeile as a mass-market thriller writer, which contrasted with its consideration of his earlier works.

Throughout the Drummond stories, much of the language used by McNeile's characters relating to ethnic minorities or Jews is considered by the academic Joan DelFattore to be "intensely conservative by modern standards"; Green observes that while the characters of other contemporary writers, such as Agatha Christie, "exhibit the inevitable xenophobia and anti-semitism of the period, McNeile's go far beyond the 'polite' norms". J.D. Bourn considers his language to be "rather distasteful", while the academic Michael Denning observed that "Drummond is a bundle of chauvinisms, hating Jews, Germans, and most other foreigners". The author and publisher Ion Trewin comments that for the readers of the 1920s and '30s, McNeile was seen at the time as "simply an upstanding Tory who spoke for many of his countrymen".

Influence
Drummond later became a model for other literary characters created in the 1940s and '50s: W. E. Johns used McNeile's work as a model for his character Biggles, while Ian Fleming stated that James Bond was "Sapper from the waist up and Mickey Spillane below".

Notes and references

Notes

References

Sources

External links 

 
 Bulldog Drummond audio and video media at Internet Archive
 Old Time Radio Bulldog Drummond at Internet Archive
 Works by H.C. McNeile on Open Library at the Internet Archive
 
 Images of the original dust jackets on McNeile's books.

America's Best Comics characters
American film series
British film series
Crime film series
Fictional British Army officers
Fictional detectives
Fictional English people
Fictional military captains
Fictional World War I veterans
Film series introduced in 1922
Literary characters introduced in 1920
Series of books